Athena Security is an American security firm that develops temperature and weapon detection systems. Its technology uses cameras, thermal imaging, low-frequency electro-magnetic technology, and artificial intelligence to detect guns, potential crime such as mass shootings, and those who may have an elevated temperature caused by infection with COVID-19.

History 
 
Athena Security was founded in 2018 by Lisa Falzone and Chris Ciabarra, both of whom co-founded Revel Systems in 2010. The first product created by Athena Security was a gun/weapon detection platform, inspired by the 2017 Las Vegas shooting and various school shootings. By 2019, the system was installed in more than 50 schools, malls, and other businesses.

Products 
 
Athena Security designs weapon and temperature detection systems. Its gun detection system is designed with smart cameras that can detect 900 types of guns and also send video feed to law enforcement if a threat (such as pulling out a gun) is detected. The system can also broadcast loud messages alerting active shooters that authorities are in route to the location. It works as a standalone system or can be used along with existing surveillance systems.
 
During the start of the COVID-19 pandemic, the company transitioned gun detection technology into detecting elevated temperatures to combat the spread of the virus. Thermal imaging is used to scan over 2,000 people per hour who walked past the system, with an accuracy rate of within .2 degrees Celsius.  
 
In May 2022, the company released a walk through metal detector system that detects threats faster than legacy metal detectors. It uses sensors, thermal imaging, low-frequency electro-magnetic technology, and artificial intelligence to detect threats. The system can scan approximately one person per second without the need for them to remove items from their persons such as phones, belts, or jewelry.

References

External links 
 
 Athena Security official website

Security companies of the United Kingdom
Companies based in Austin, Texas
Companies established in 2018